The Badge "For the Merit to the City" first, second or third class, is the award of Kryvyi Rih city, Ukraine, given to individuals for outstanding achievements in economics, science, culture, military or political spheres of activity. It was established by mayor Yuri Lyubonenko in October 2006. There are 3 grades, the highest being the first grade honours.

Medals and ribbons of the badge

References

Awards established in 2006
2006 establishments in Ukraine
Military awards and decorations of Ukraine
Civil awards and decorations of Ukraine
Municipal awards